Feith is a surname. Notable people with the surname include:
 Constant Feith (1884–1958), Dutch athlete
 Douglas J. Feith (born 1953), American official
 Greg Feith (born 1957), Air Safety Investigator with the NTSB
 Herbert Feith (1930–2001), Australian academic and scholar of Indonesian politics
 Pieter Feith (born 1945), Dutch diplomat
 Rhijnvis Feith (1753–1824), Dutch poet

See also
 Feit